Chiloe micropteron is a species of wasp of the family Rotoitidae. The species was described by Gibson and Huber in 2000 from specimens collected in Chile.  The generic name is derived from Chiloé Island where many of the specimens were collected, and the species name is derived from its very small fore wings.

References

Insects described in 2000
Chalcidoidea
Endemic fauna of Chile